Çalışkanlar is a village in the Hizan District of Bitlis Province in Turkey. Its population is 145 (2021).

References

Villages in Hizan District